The legislative assemblies of the Roman Empire were political institutions in the ancient Roman Empire. During the reign of the second Roman Emperor, Tiberius, the powers that had been held by the Roman assemblies (the comitia) were transferred to the senate. The neutering of the assemblies had become inevitable for reasons beyond the fact that they were composed of the rabble of Rome. The electors were, in general, ignorant as to the merits of the important questions that were laid before them, and often willing to sell their votes to the highest bidder.

Curiate, century and tribal assemblies
It was Rome's own success that caused the ultimate obsolescence of the assemblies. Under the Roman Republic, it was the People of Rome who held the ultimate sovereignty, and thus the ultimate power over the state. Exercising this sovereign power was the purpose of the popular assemblies. The very idea of a system of popular assemblies, however, was more fitting for a city-state than it was for a world empire. When Roman territory was confined to a limited geographical area, the assemblies were more representative of the popular will, but by the time that Rome had grown into a world power, very few Romans had a practical chance to vote. Therefore, in practice, the assemblies were so unrepresentative as to be undemocratic. After the founding of the Roman Empire, the People of Rome continued to organize by centuries and by tribes, but by this point, these divisions had lost most of their relevance.

After the fall of the republic, the "Curiate Assembly" no longer passed the lex curiata de imperio. This power was transferred to the senate. This was the one measure by which the republican Curiate Assembly had political relevance. After the founding of the empire, while this assembly continued to consist of thirty lictors, it only retained the power to witness wills and to ratify adoptions.

Under the empire, soldiers continued to organize by centuries, but the centuries had long lost all of their political relevance. The division of the "Centuriate Assembly" into centuries of senior soldiers and junior soldiers continued well into the empire, as did their classification on the basis of property ownership. While the machinery of the Centuriate Assembly continued to exist well into the life of the empire, the assembly lost all of its practical relevance. Under the empire, all gatherings of the Centuriate Assembly were in the form of an unsorted convention. Legislation was never submitted to the imperial Centuriate Assembly, and the one major legislative power that this assembly had held under the republic, the right to declare war, was now held exclusively by the emperor. All judicial powers that had been held by the republican Centuriate Assembly were transferred to independent jury courts, and under the emperor Tiberius, all of its former electoral powers were transferred to the senate. After it had lost all of these powers, it had no remaining authority. Its only remaining function was, after the senate had 'elected' the magistrates, to hear the renuntiatio, The renuntiatio had no legal purpose, but instead was a ceremony in which the results of the election were read to the electors. This allowed the emperor to claim that the magistrates had been "elected" by a sovereign people.

After the founding of the empire, the tribal divisions of citizens and freedmen continued, but the only political purpose of the tribal divisions was such that they better enabled the senate to maintain a list of citizens. Tribal divisions also simplified the process by which grain was distributed. Eventually, most freedmen belonged to one of the four urban tribes, while most freemen belonged to one of the thirty-one rural tribes. Heredity continued to be the basis upon which membership in a particular tribe was determined. Under the emperor Tiberius, the electoral powers of the "Tribal Assembly" were transferred to the senate. Each year, after the senate had elected the annual magistrates, the Tribal Assembly also heard the renuntiatio. Any legislation that the emperor submitted to the assemblies for ratification were submitted to the Tribal Assembly. The assembly ratified imperial decrees, starting with the emperor Augustus, and continuing until the emperor Domitian. The ratification of legislation by the assembly, however, had no legal importance as the emperor could make any decree into law, even without the acquiescence of the assemblies. Thus, under the empire, the chief executive again became the chief lawgiver, which was a power he had not held since the days of the early republic. The "Plebeian Council" also survived the fall of the republic, and it also lost its legislative, judicial and electoral powers to the senate. By virtue of his tribunician powers, the emperor always had absolute control over the council.

See also

 Roman Kingdom
 Roman Republic
 Roman Empire
 Roman Law
 Plebeian Council
 Centuria
 Curia
 Roman consul
 Praetor
 Roman censor
 Quaestor
 Aedile
 Roman Dictator
 Master of the Horse
 Roman Senate
 Cursus honorum
 Byzantine Senate
 Pontifex Maximus
 Princeps senatus
 Interrex
 Promagistrate
 Acta Senatus

References

 Abbott, Frank Frost (1901). A History and Description of Roman Political Institutions. Elibron Classics.
 Byrd, Robert (1995). The Senate of the Roman Republic. U.S. Government Printing Office, Senate Document 103-23.
 Cicero, Marcus Tullius (1841). The Political Works of Marcus Tullius Cicero: Comprising his Treatise on the Commonwealth; and his Treatise on the Laws. Translated from the original, with Dissertations and Notes in Two Volumes. By Francis Barham, Esq. London: Edmund Spettigue. Vol. 1.
 Lintott, Andrew (1999). The Constitution of the Roman Republic. Oxford University Press.

 Polybius (1823). The General History of Polybius: Translated from the Greek. By James Hampton. Oxford: Printed by W. Baxter. Fifth Edition, Vol 2.
 Taylor, Lily Ross (1966). Roman Voting Assemblies: From the Hannibalic War to the Dictatorship of Caesar. The University of Michigan Press.

Notes

Further reading

 Ihne, Wilhelm. Researches Into the History of the Roman Constitution. William Pickering. 1853. 
 Johnston, Harold Whetstone. Orations and Letters of Cicero: With Historical Introduction, An Outline of the Roman Constitution, Notes, Vocabulary and Index. Scott, Foresman and Company. 1891.
 Mommsen, Theodor. Roman Constitutional Law. 1871-1888
 Tighe, Ambrose. The Development of the Roman Constitution. D. Apple & Co. 1886.
 Von Fritz, Kurt. The Theory of the Mixed Constitution in Antiquity. Columbia University Press, New York. 1975.
 The Histories by Polybius
 Cambridge Ancient History, Volumes 9–13.
 A. Cameron, The Later Roman Empire, (Fontana Press, 1993).
 M. Crawford, The Roman Republic, (Fontana Press, 1978).
 E. S. Gruen, "The Last Generation of the Roman Republic" (U California Press, 1974)
 F. Millar, The Emperor in the Roman World, (Duckworth, 1977, 1992).
 A. Lintott, "The Constitution of the Roman Republic" (Oxford University Press, 1999)

Primary sources
 Cicero's De Re Publica, Book Two
 Rome at the End of the Punic Wars: An Analysis of the Roman Government; by Polybius

Secondary source material
 Considerations on the Causes of the Greatness of the Romans and their Decline, by Montesquieu
 The Roman Constitution to the Time of Cicero
 What a Terrorist Incident in Ancient Rome Can Teach Us

Government of the Roman Empire
Popular assemblies